Henri Patrick Mboma Dem (born 15 November 1970) is a Cameroonian former professional footballer who played as a striker. He is the former all-time top goal-scorer for the Cameroon national team.

Club career
Born in Douala, Cameroon, Mboma started his domestic football career in 1993. During his career he played for Châteauroux, Paris Saint-Germain, Metz, Gamba Osaka, Cagliari, Parma, Sunderland (where he scored once against Tottenham Hotspur), Al-Ittihad, Tokyo Verdy and Vissel Kobe before retiring on 16 May 2005.

International career
After first being capped for Cameroon in 1995, Mboma scored 33 goals in 57 matches. He played in the 1998 and 2002 World Cups, and also led Cameroon to the gold medal at the 2000 Olympics and victories at the 2000 and 2002 African Nations Cups. He was named African Footballer of the Year for his efforts in 2000. He scored a memorable overhead kick against France in 2000 .

Career statistics

Club

International

Honours
Paris Saint-Germain
 Coupe de France: 1994–95
 Coupe de la Ligue: 1995

Metz
 Coupe de la Ligue: 1996

Parma
 Coppa Italia: 2001–02
Cameroon
 Summer Olympics: 2000
 African Nations Cup: 2000, 2002
Individual
 African Footballer of the Year: 2000
 BBC African Footballer of the Year: 2000
 African Nations Cup top scorer: 2002
 J.League Top Scorer: 1997
 J.League Best XI: 1997
 Coppa Italia top scorer: 1999–2000

References

External links
 
 
 

Living people
1970 births
Footballers from Douala
Cameroonian footballers
African Footballer of the Year winners
Association football forwards
FC Metz players
Paris Saint-Germain F.C. players
LB Châteauroux players
Sunderland A.F.C. players
Cagliari Calcio players
Parma Calcio 1913 players
Gamba Osaka players
Tokyo Verdy players
Vissel Kobe players
Al-Ittihad Club (Tripoli) players
Ligue 1 players
Ligue 2 players
Championnat National players
J1 League players
Serie A players
Premier League players
Cameroon international footballers
Footballers at the 2000 Summer Olympics
Olympic footballers of Cameroon
Olympic gold medalists for Cameroon
Olympic medalists in football
Medalists at the 2000 Summer Olympics
1998 FIFA World Cup players
2001 FIFA Confederations Cup players
2002 FIFA World Cup players
1998 African Cup of Nations players
2000 African Cup of Nations players
2002 African Cup of Nations players
2004 African Cup of Nations players
Cameroonian expatriate footballers
Expatriate footballers in Italy
Expatriate footballers in Japan
Cameroonian expatriate sportspeople in Libya
Expatriate footballers in Libya
Expatriate footballers in France
Expatriate footballers in England
Libyan Premier League players